Vermont Route 105 (VT 105) is a  state highway located in northern Vermont in the United States. The route runs from U.S. Route 7 (US 7) in St. Albans in the west to the New Hampshire state line in Bloomfield in the east. The road continues across the state line as Bridge Street, a short unnumbered  New Hampshire state route to US 3 in North Stratford, New Hampshire. As it is not a New Hampshire state highway, the connection is signed with Vermont state highway signage, similar to how connections to Vermont state routes are indicated elsewhere in New Hampshire.

Moose are most often encountered on four roads in Vermont, of which this is one. They are seen from Island Pond to Bloomfield.

Route description

St. Albans to North Troy 
VT 105 begins at a fork from US 7 (Swanton Road) in the Franklin County city of St. Albans. VT 105 runs northeast along Sheldon Road, a two-lane road paralleling nearby railroad tracks. The route turns east and merges into Seymour Road, which changes names to Sheldon. Running along the northern side of St. Albans, becoming a two-lane rural road in the town of St. Albans. After a straight stretch of eastbound roadway, VT 105 crosses under, but does not intersect with Interstate 89. Now running northeast, VT 105 reaches a junction with the northern terminus of VT 104 (Fisher Pond Road).

At this junction, VT 105 turns further to the northeast, retaining the Sheldon Road moniker as it crosses through rural St. Albans. Entering the town of Swanton, the route remains rural, crossing railroad tracks. The route soon crosses into the rural hamlet of Greens Corners, crossing into the town of Sheldon. At the junction with Bedard Road, VT 105 enters a small residential area in town, running north to the intersection with Woods Hill Road. At Woods Hill Road, VT 105 turns northeast again, crossing through woods and fields in Sheldon. VT 105 turns eastward, then bends southeast into the hamlet of Sheldon Springs.

Crossing through Sheldon Springs, VT 105 crosses railroad tracks, paralleling with nearby Mill Street, which merges back in. The route runs southeast out of Sheldon Springs, paralleling the tracks, and crossing Missisquoi River. VT 105 reaches the hamlet of Sheldon Junction and an intersection with the eastern end of VT 78. Crossing through Sheldon Junction, the route makes a curve to the northeast again, paralleling the Missisquoi River. VT 105 becomes a rural roadway again, continuing near the river into a junction with VT 120 (Kane Road). VT 105 continues northeast along the riverside before beginning an eastbound wind through Sheldon. Passing an intersection with VT 236 (State Park Road).

VT 105 soon crosses into Enosburg Falls runs southeast into the village, being main west–east road through the community. Soon, the route meets a junction with VT 108 (Main Street), which becomes concurrent at the junction with VT 105 turning northeast along Main Street. Now the main north–south road through Enosburg Falls, passing commercial roads through the city. VT 108 and VT 105 continue northeast until the junction with West Berkshire Road, where VT 108 turns off to the northwest and VT 105 turns northeast on Sampsonville Road. VT 105 soon leaves Enosburg Falls, entering the town of Enosburg.

Retaining the name Sampsonville Road, VT 105 winds east along the river, reaching the hamlet of Sampsonville. Changing names to East Berkshire Road, crossing into the town of Berkshire and junction with VT 118 (Berkshire Center Road). VT 118 and VT 105 are concurrent for a short stretch, reaching Montgomery Road, where VT 118 turns off. The route bends north as East Berkshire Road, continuing through the town of Berkshire. Continuing along the riverside, VT 105 soon enters the town of Richford, where it is a two-lane residential street. At the junction with Troy Street, VT 139 begins as Main Street, while VT 105 turns off on Troy.

VT 105 runs southeast through Richford, paralleling the riverside out of the hamlet as Jay Road. Fast approaching the Canada–United States border, the route turns northeast and into a junction with VT 105A (Glen-Sutton Road). VT 105A runs northeast to border while VT 105 runs through dense woods in Richford. Making a huge curve to the southeast, the route parallels the border, crossing into Orleans County. Now in the town of Troy, the route bends southeast and then makes a curve to the northeast, along some mountainsides in town. The dense woods start to break up as VT 105 reaches a junction with VT 101.

North Troy to New Hampshire 
VT 101 ends at the junction as VT 105 takes over the right-of-way, running north into village of North Troy. In North Troy, VT 105 turns eastward along North Pleasant Street after a junction with VT 243, which runs to the Quebec border and Route 243. Running along North Pleasant, VT 105 crosses the east branch of the Missisquoi River, changing names to East Main, and turning southeast along a parallel of nearby railroad tracks. The tracks soon divert to the northeast as VT 105 returns to the town of Troy, running southeast through the rural town and turning east once again.

After crossing the railroad tracks again, VT 105 crosses into the town of Newport, paralleling a nearby creek. The route enters the hamlet of Newport, where it is the main northwest–southeast street through the community as a two-lane residential road. VT 105 soon leaves the hamlet, remaining in the town of Newport. Continuing southeast, the route reaches the northern terminus of VT 100, which trades its right-of-way to VT 105, running northeast. The route bends east, crossing into the town of Coventry. North of Walker Pond, the route bends northeast and turns east into the city of Newport.

Now named Highland Avenue, VT 105 runs eastward along the hills around Newport, reaching a junction with US 5 (Pleasant Street). VT 105 and US 5 become concurrent along Pleasant Street, becoming the main street in the city. A block later, the route turns north on Third Street, heading toward Lake Memphremagog. Two blocks north of Pleasant Street, it turns east onto Main Street, paralleling the shoreline of the lake. At Railroad Square, VT 105 and US 5 turn north and crosses the lake. On the other side of the lake, the route parallels the Clyde River, reaching a junction with the western terminus of VT 191.

Now known as Union Street, VT 105 and US 5 turn east onto East Main Street, paralleling north of VT 191. After the junction with Western Avenue, the route continues along East Main, passing north of Clyde Pond. Now in the town of Derby, it turns northeast and away from VT 191, entering an interchange with I-91 (exit 28). VT 105 and US 5 enter Derby Center as the main west–east street. At the eastern end of the community VT 105 turns south on the same right-of-way. At this junction, VT 5A becomes concurrent with VT 105, which south through the southern edges of Derby Center, intersecting with the western end of VT 111.

VT 105 and VT 5A run southeast out of Derby Center and into the town of Derby, paralleling Lake Salem, which soon becomes another portion of the Clyde River. VT 105 and VT 5A continue along the Clyde, crossing into the town of Charleston. Now known as East Charleston Road, bending eastward into the hamlet of West Charleston. The route bends southward past Charleston Pond, where VT 5A forks to the southwest. Paralleling the Clyde River, reaching Pensioner Pond, which is surrounded by both routes on each shore, VT 105 turns further to the southeast, passing through the hamlet of East Charleston.

Crossing the Pherrins River, VT 105 crosses into Essex County and the town of Brighton. Paralleling the Pherrins River, VT 105 continues southeast into a junction with VT 114 (East Haven Road). VT 105 and VT 114 run northeast through Brighton, reaching the hamlet of Island Pond. Now known as Derby Street, the routes reach the namesake pond, turning north onto Cross Street. One block north on Cross, VT  VT 105 turns east onto East Brighton Road. Paralleling railroad tracks and Island Pond, VT 105 runs southeast, leaving Island Pond hamlet for Brighton State Park.

The route continues southeast through woods, passing the John H. Boylan State Airport as it turns eastward, passing Nulhegan Pond. Now paralleling the Nulhegan River, VT 105 enters the town of Ferdinand, crossing through the hamlet of East Brighton. Continuing along the railroad tracks, VT 105 makes a long bend southeast and turns northeast again up a mountainside. Running along a mountainside, the route runs east paralleling the Nulhegan River, making a large bend southward into the town of Brunswick and soon into the village of Bloomfield. In Bloomfield, VT 105 runs northwest–southeast, crossing a junction with VT 102. After VT 102, VT 105 crosses the Connecticut River and enters the state of New Hampshire, marking the eastern end of VT 105. After the bridge, Bridge Street runs east for two blocks to a junction with US 3.

Major intersections

Vermont Route 105A 

Its southern terminus VT 105. It runs parallel with the Missisquoi River to the Canadian border, terminating at the East Richford–Glen Sutton Border Crossing and the Missisquoi River Bridge.

References

External links

Termini of Vermont Route 105

105
Transportation in Essex County, Vermont
Transportation in Franklin County, Vermont
Transportation in Orleans County, Vermont